Sour Grapes is an American crime documentary about wine fraudster  Rudy Kurniawan. Filmmakers Jerry Rothwell and Reuben Atlas  debuted the documentary at film festivals in October 2016 and on Netflix  the following month.

Premise 
Rudy Kurniawan was a rich Indonesian wine collector with a fascination for Burgundy, and he spent millions of dollars on wine and also sold countless bottles of fake wine. Acker Merrall & Condit, an auction company, broke records by selling  worth of Kurniawan's wines in 2006 (equivalent to about $M in ). In 2008, the firm held a sale at a Manhattan restaurant, promising the wines would be authenticated by "some of Burgundy's most discerning connoisseurs." Included were alleged bottles of Domaine Ponsot Clos Saint-Denis from the years 1945, 1949 and 1966, but an estate proprietor revealed that that particular wine had not been produced until 1982. In 2012, the Federal Bureau of Investigation raided Kurniawan's house in Arcadia, Los Angeles and discovered his wine fraud, whereby he collected empty bottles and refilled them with cheaper wine and then forged the labels. In 2014, he became the first person in the United States to be convicted of the crime, and was given a ten-year sentence by a New York federal judge. Kurniawan declined to be interviewed for the documentary.

Cast 
In alphabetical order; credits adapted from IMDb
 Arthur Sarkissian
 Bill Koch – businessman and collector
 Brad Goldstein – Bill Koch's spokesperson
 Corie Brown – food and wine writer, Zester Daily
 David Fredston – private equity investor, Sole Source Capital
 Don Cornwell – lawyer and burgundy wine expert
 Eddie Tansil – wanted Indonesian embezzler (archive footage), Kurniawan's uncle.
 James Wynne – FBI agent specialized in counterfeit goods (as Jim Wynne)
 Jason Hernandez – prosecutor in the Rudy Kurniawan case
 Jay McInerney – novelist and wine columnist
 Jefery Levy – Jef Levy
 Jerome Mooney – Rudy Kurniawan's defense attorney (as Jerry Mooney)
 John Kapon – wine merchant and auctioneer (archive footage)
 Laurent Ponsot – wine producer in Burgundy, France
 Maureen Downey – wine consultant
 Rajat Parr – sommelier
 Rudy Kurniawan – convicted wine counterfeiter (archive footage)
 Vincent Veridiamo – Rudy Kurniawan's defense attorney

Reviews 
The Hollywood Reporter stated the filmmakers "thoroughly and concisely detailed the progression of Kurniawan’s fraud in a style that merges an Antiques Roadshow-style fascination with rare wines with a Lifestyles of the Rich and Famous-type fixation on the spending habits of the overly affluent."

References 

2016 films
American documentary films
Documentary films about wine
2010s English-language films
2010s American films